The Caproni Ca.20 was an early monoplane fighter. Developed by Giovanni Battista Caproni in 1914. The only prototype made is today on display at the Museum of Flight in Seattle, Washington, United States.

History of the design
The Ca.20 was derived from the Ca.18, an observation monoplane that had been developed starting in 1913 from the previous models Ca.8 and Ca.16. It used a more powerful engine, the Rhône. It used an unusual rounded nose cover for the wooden propeller which was cowled smoothly to match the fuselage. The cover was pierced to allow cooling of the engine. The improved aerodynamics helped speed and manoeuvrability. Designed as a fighter, a Lewis machine gun was installed above the pilot, placed above the propeller disc, with an eye level sight. The first synchronization devices, which allowed a weapon to shoot with confidence through the blades of a propeller in motion, would not make their appearance until the Fokker Eindecker during 1915, although many experiments had been conducted by the French since 1913.

History of the prototype

Only a single Caproni Ca.20 was ever built, because the Italian government rejected the design in favor of bomber aircraft. The prototype was stored in a barn on Giovanni Battista Caproni's property for 85 years, before being sold to the Museum of Flight in Seattle in 1999. The dry climate had preserved the aircraft, and with the exception of the tires, which had been gnawed by rodents, the prototype Caproni Ca.20 displayed at the Museum of Flight includes all its original parts.

References
 Museum of Flight Ca.20

External links

 The Caproni Ca.20 of the Museum of Flight
 airwar.ru: Caproni Ca.20 (Russian)

Ca.020
Military aircraft of World War I
1910s Italian fighter aircraft
Rotary-engined aircraft
Aircraft first flown in 1914